Tanee McCall (born April 17, 1981) is an American actress and dancer notable for her appearance as the lead in music videos as well as her role as Toya in You Got Served.

Filmography
Brother's Blood (2016)
Burlesque (2010) as Scarlett
The Losers (2010) as Jolene
Coastal Dreams (TV series, 2007) as Stacey
Hairspray (2007) as Dynamite
The Shield (2006, 1 episode "Rap Payback") as Liberty
All of Us (2005, 1 episode "Kiss, Kiss, Pass") as Christina
Coach Carter (2005) as Dancer #1
Starsky & Hutch (2004) as Dancer #1
You Got Served (2004) as Toya
Looney Tunes: Back in Action (2003) as Dancer #1

Music videos
Marques Houston's Clubbin feat. Joe Budden (2003)
Marques Houston's That Girl (2003)

Tours
I Am... World Tour (2009)
The Scream Tour 3 (2002)
The Scream Tour 2 (2001)

References

External links

1981 births
American film actresses
Living people
Actresses from Los Angeles
American female dancers
American dancers
21st-century American women